Rock 'N' Roll Comics was a comic book series published by Revolutionary Comics from 1989 to 1993. Revolutionary's flagship title, the series was notable for its unauthorized and unlicensed biographies of rock stars, told in comic book form but well-researched and geared to adults, often with adult situations (nudity, drug use, violence, etc.).

Some musicians featured in the comics, like Frank Zappa and KISS, were supportive; while others, like the New Kids on the Block, considered the comic akin to a bootleg recording and sued the publisher. Publisher Todd Loren's legal victory in the U.S. District Court established that unauthorized comic book biographies were entitled to the same protections as other unauthorized biographies.

Rock 'N' Roll Comics originally contained straight biographies in comics form and Mad magazine-style parodies (all written by Loren). The parodies were dropped after about 18 issues. Early issues also featured the Loren/Larry Nadolsky character Stan Back in a series of humorous one-page strips. Loren wrote many of the early lead stories; Jay Allen Sanford took over as lead writer with issue #22. The stories were illustrated by a grab-bag of artists without many other credits in the industry.

The series sported cover slogans reading "Unauthorized and Proud of It" or "100% Unauthorized Material". Rock 'N' Roll Comics was published in a typical 6½" × 9¾" comic book format. Issues were typically 32 pages in length, printed mostly in black-and-white with a color cover. Many covers were painted by Scott Jackson. The letters page — which often featured spirited editorials by Loren — was known as "Revolutionary Comments." Although the series is numbered through 65 issues, a total of 63 issues were released due to two issues, numbers 8 and 61, never being published due to legal challenges.

Publication history 
Revolutionary Comics publisher Todd Loren was inspired to launch Rock 'N' Roll Comics in part by the success of an unauthorized Bruce Springsteen parody one-shot comic called Hey Boss (Visionary Graphics, 1986).

Hey Boss artist Larry Nadolsky was hired to draw the first issue of Rock 'N' Roll Comics, profiling Guns N' Roses. Upon the comic's release, cover-dated June 1989, Guns N' Roses lawyer Peter Paterno sent Revolutionary a cease and desist order. This was reported in a Rolling Stone story that directly resulted in the entire 10,000-copy print run selling out in two weeks, thanks to buyers who thought Guns N' Roses would sue Revolutionary Comics out of existence. In actuality, no lawsuits were ever filed, and the comic went into multiple new printings, eventually totaling over 150,000 copies.

Rock 'N' Roll Comics #3 and #4, on Bon Jovi and Mötley Crüe, respectively (cover-dated Sept. 1989 and Oct. 1989), did result in legal challenges. Both bands had exclusive merchandising deals with Great Southern Productions/Winterland Productions, which threatened comics distributors over carrying the issues and got a court injunction prohibiting Revolutionary from distributing them. This forced Revolutionary to build its own distribution network outside traditional comic shops, eventually getting them into music and gift retail outlets which had never carried comics before. This independence from the comic book marketplace served the company well, as sales continued to rise from issue to issue, with their Metallica comic going into multiple print runs totaling over 75,000 copies.

Issue #8 (cover-dated Feb. 1990), featuring Skid Row, was never published, due to an injunction prompted by Great Southern. It was skipped in number sequencing; issue #9 (Kiss) was cover-dated Mar. 1990.

Issue #12 (cover-dated June 1990), featuring New Kids on the Block, resulted in a number of legal battles. (see: Litigation, below) Ironically, this and the other lawsuits garnered Revolutionary worldwide press, eventually resulting in record-breaking sales for an indie comic publisher.

Beginning with issue #19 (Public Enemy / 2 Live Crew), Rock 'N' Roll Comics was released on a biweekly basis from Jan. 1991–Mar. 1992, comprising 25 total issues.

Issue #61 (cover-dated July 1993), scheduled to be about the band Yes, was never published, and ultimately was skipped in number sequencing.

The series' final issue, #65, on "Sci-Fi Space Rockers" (Pink Floyd, Genesis, Marillion, Hawkwind, and others) was cover-dated Nov. 1993.

Spin-off titles 
The popularity of Rock 'N' Roll Comics led Revolutionary to publish other music titles, most notably Rock 'N' Roll Comics Magazine (a reprint title featuring stories from past issues of Rock 'N' Roll Comics), Hard Rock Comics (a title dedicated to hard rock, heavy metal, and punk bands), and Star Jam Comics (a title dedicated to pop acts as well as actors from the television show Beverly Hills, 90210). Additionally, Revolutionary published a line of Experience limited series focusing entirely on one band or musical artist. The titles were The Beatles Experience, The Elvis Presley Experience, The Led Zeppelin Experience, and The Pink Floyd Experience.

Bluewater Productions collections 
In September 2009, 15 years after the demise of Revolutionary Comics, publisher Bluewater Productions announced it would be reprinting Revolutionary's line of music comics (including stories from Rock 'N' Roll Comics) in ten monthly volumes, averaging 250 pages each. The first collections were The Beatles Experience and Hard Rock Heroes, released in early 2010.

Many of Revolutionary's original creators participated in updating and modernizing the contents of the musical comic bios. The reprints and updates were supervised by long-time Rock 'N' Roll Comics writer/editor Jay Allen Sanford. Ultimately, Bluewater released seven titles from 2010 to 2012:

 The Beatles Experience (Feb. 2010), 240 pp. 
 Hard Rock Heroes (Apr. 2010), 240 pp.  — with AC/DC, Metallica, Guns N' Roses, Ozzy Osbourne/Black Sabbath, Van Halen, Megadeth, Vanilla Fudge, Queensrÿche, Motörhead, ZZ Top
 The Runaways: Joan Jett – Lita Ford (Aug. 2010), 32 pp.
 The Pink Floyd Experience (Sept. 2010), 150 pp. 
 The Led Zeppelin Experience (Nov. 2010), 150 pp. 
 The Elvis Presley Experience (Mar. 2011), 210 pp. 
 Stan Lee: the Biography! (Feb. 2012), 32 pp. 

Two other projected volumes, Rock 'N' Roll Cartoon History: The Sixties; and  Rock 'N' Roll Cartoon History: The Seventies, remain unpublished.

Litigation 
Rock 'N' Roll Comics #12 (cover-date June 1990), an unauthorized biography of New Kids on the Block, resulted in Revolutionary being sued again. Publisher Loren claimed the First Amendment protected the journalistic rights of his "illustrated articles" and he took the matter to the United States District Court for the Southern District of California.

Loren set up a 900 number, "Nuke the New Kids," to raise money for the company's defense ($10.00 per call, billed by phone company). In April 1990, U.S. District Judge John S. Rhoades declared that Rock 'N' Roll Comics #12 could legally be distributed because it is "part biography and part satire." The judge's twelve-page ruling stated that "bookstores are filled with biographies — both authorized and unauthorized — of public figures. And, while the subjects of such biographies may be offended by the publication of their life stories, they generally have no claim for trademark infringement."

Rhoades' ruling also stated "It appears that the First Amendment may trump any claim that the plaintiffs have for trademark infringement." The resultant order stated that Winterland Concessions Co. failed to show that the case met the standards required to issue a preliminary injunction. This dissolved the temporary restraining order prohibiting distribution. Nonetheless, the New Kids responded by filing suit for trademark infringement since their logo appeared in the comic. A settlement between the New Kids and Revolutionary was reached in August 1990. It permanently enjoined Revolutionary from "advertising, manufacturing, distributing and/or selling or otherwise commercially exploiting any publication displaying the trademark and/or logo of the New Kids on the Block, either as a group or individually." Loren promptly reprinted the New Kids story in magazine format (Rock 'N' Roll Comics Magazine), without depicting the band's logo anywhere in the story.

Documentary film 
In 2005, BulletProof Film released a documentary film titled Unauthorized and Proud of It: Todd Loren's Rock 'N' Roll Comics. The film features interviews with Loren's family, surviving "Revolutionaries," comic book colleagues, adversaries, supporters and past and present rock 'n' roll stars featured in Revolutionary's comics. Appearing in the film are Alice Cooper, publishers Gary Groth (Fantagraphics) and Denis Kitchen (Kitchen Sink Press), famed groupie Cynthia Plaster Caster, underground painter and RevCom cover artist Robert Williams (known for his controversial album art for the first Guns N' Roses LP), Jay Allen Sanford, Gene Simmons (audio only), and more.

The film also details the San Diego police department's investigation into Todd Loren's 1992 murder; interviews with Loren's coworkers and family members suggest that the police failed to follow up on all available leads. The film was released on DVD in April 2012 by Wild Eye Releasing, under the title Unauthorized: The Story of Rock 'N' Roll Comics. The DVD includes over two hours of bonus footage, interviews, news footage, and art galleries, and liner notes by long-time Rock 'N' Roll Comics writer-editor Jay Allen Sanford.

Issue guide

See also 
 Behind the Music

References

Notes

Sources consulted 

 "Todd Loren's Rock 'N' Roll Comics," Bay Area Reporter (May 11, 2006)

External links
 Rock 'N' Roll Comics at ComicVine
 Rock 'N' Roll Comics tribute site

 Jay Allen Sanford interview, Cosmic Book News (2010)
 "Rock 'N' Roll Comics: The Inside Story," San Diego Reader blog (September 12, 2007).

Cultural depictions of rock musicians
1989 comics debuts
Comics based on musical groups
Underground comix